Nina Predanič (born 28 May 1997) is a Slovenian footballer who plays as a forward for Grasshopper Club Zürich and the Slovenia women's national team.

References

1997 births
Living people
Slovenian women's footballers
Women's association football forwards
Croatian Women's First Football League players
ŽNK Split players
Slovenia women's international footballers
Slovenian expatriate footballers
Slovenian expatriate sportspeople in Croatia
Expatriate women's footballers in Croatia